Carex arenaria, or sand sedge, is a species of perennial sedge of the genus Carex which is commonly found growing in dunes and other sandy habitats, as the species epithet suggests (Latin , "sandy"). It grows by long stolons under the soil surface.

External links 
Flora Europaea: Carex arenaria L. 
Nordic virtual flora 

arenaria
Plants described in 1753
Flora of Europe
Taxa named by Carl Linnaeus